The 1968 New Orleans Saints season was the team's second as a member of the National Football League (NFL). They improved on their previous season's output of 3–11, winning four games. The team failed to qualify for the playoffs for the second consecutive season, and finished third in the Century Division of the NFL Eastern Conference.

Offseason

NFL draft

Personnel

Staff

Roster

Schedule 

Note: Intra-division opponents are in bold text.

Standings

References 

New Orleans Saints seasons
New Orleans Saints
New Orl